The men's Greco-Roman bantamweight competition at the 1956 Summer Olympics in Melbourne took place from 3 December to 6 December at the Royal Exhibition Building. Nations were limited to one competitor.

Competition format
This Greco-Roman wrestling competition continued to use the "bad points" elimination system introduced at the 1928 Summer Olympics for Greco-Roman and at the 1932 Summer Olympics for freestyle wrestling, as modified in 1952 (adding medal rounds and making all losses worth 3 points—from 1936 to 1948 losses by split decision only cost 2). Each round featured all wrestlers pairing off and wrestling one bout (with one wrestler having a bye if there were an odd number). The loser received 3 points. The winner received 1 point if the win was by decision and 0 points if the win was by fall. At the end of each round, any wrestler with at least 5 points was eliminated. This elimination continued until the medal rounds, which began when 3 wrestlers remained. These 3 wrestlers each faced each other in a round-robin medal round (with earlier results counting, if any had wrestled another before); record within the medal round determined medals, with bad points breaking ties.

Results

Round 1

 Bouts

 Points

Round 2

 Bouts

 Points

Round 3

 Bouts

 Points

Round 4

Vyrupayev had defeated Hódos; Kammerer had a bye while neither of the other two wrestlers tied at 5 points had one.

 Bouts

 Points

Medal rounds

Horvath's victory over Vyrupayev in round 1 counted for the medal rounds. The three medalists all finished 1–1 against each other. Vyrupayev had the best result within the group, with his win coming by unanimous decision as opposed to the split-decision wins of the other two medalists; he took gold. Of the two remaining wrestlers, Vesterby had defeated Horvath head-to-head and took silver. Horvath earned bronze.

 Bouts

 Points

References

Wrestling at the 1956 Summer Olympics